Alfred Kazin (June 5, 1915 – June 5, 1998) was an American writer and literary critic.  He wrote often about the immigrant experience in early twentieth century America.

Early life
Like many other New York Intellectuals, Alfred Kazin was the son of Jewish immigrants, born in the Brownsville section of Brooklyn and a graduate of the City College of New York. However, his politics were more moderate than most of the New York Intellectuals, many of whom were socialists.

Career
Kazin was deeply affected by his peers' subsequent disillusion with socialism and liberalism. Adam Kirsch writes in The New Republic that "having invested his romantic self-image in liberalism, Kazin perceived abandonment of liberalism by his peers as an attack on his identity".

He wrote out of a great passion—or great disgust—for what he was reading and embedded his opinions in a deep knowledge of history, both literary history and politics and culture. In 1996 he was awarded the first Truman Capote Lifetime Achievement Award in Literary Criticism, which carries a cash reward of $100,000. As of 2014, the only other person to have won the award was George Steiner.

Personal life
Kazin was friends with Hannah Arendt.

Kazin's son from his second marriage is historian and Dissent co-editor Michael Kazin. Alfred Kazin married his third wife, the writer Ann Birstein, in 1952, and they divorced in 1982; their daughter is Cathrael Kazin, who is a managing partner at Volta Learning Group.

Kazin married a fourth time, and is survived by his widow, the writer Judith Dunford.

Death
Kazin died in Manhattan on his 83rd birthday.

Bibliography

Author
 On Native Grounds: An Interpretation of Modern American Prose Literature (1942)
 The Open Street (1948)
 A Walker in the City (1951)
 The Inmost Leaf: Essays on American and European Writers (1955)
 Contemporaries: Essays on Modern Life and Literature (1963)
 Starting Out in the Thirties (1965)
 Bright Book of Life: American Novelists and Storytellers from Hemingway to Mailer (1973)
 New York Jew (1978)
 The State of the Book World, 1980: Three Talks (1980), with Dan Lacy and Ernest L. Boyer
 An American Procession: The Major American Writers from 1830 to 1930—The Crucial Century (1984)
 A Writer's America: Landscape in Literature (1988)
 Our New York (1989), co-authored with David Finn
 The Emmy Parrish Lectures in American Studies (1991)
 Writing Was Everything (1995)
 A Lifetime Burning in Every Moment: From the Journals of Alfred Kazin (1996)
 God and the American Writer (1997)
 Alfred Kazin's America: Critical and Personal Writings (2003) edited and with an introduction by Ted Solotaroff
 Alfred Kazin's Journals (2011),  selected and edited by Richard M. Cook

Editor (selected)
 The Portable Blake The Viking Press 1946, reprinted  many times between 1959 and 1975; Penguin Books 1976, reprinted 1977,  
 F. Scott Fitzgerald: The Man and His Work
 The Stature of Theodore Dreiser, co-edited with Charles Shapiro
 Emerson: A Modern Anthology, co-edited with Daniel Aaron
 The Works of Anne Frank, co-edited with Ann Birstein
 The Open Form: Essays for Our Time
 Selected Short Stories of Nathaniel Hawthorne

References

External links
 Alfred Kazin, champion of American literature: An appreciation by Fred Mazelis on the World Socialist Web Site
 “Correspondence between Hannah Arendt and Alfred Kazin”, with an Introduction & Commentary by Helgard Mahrdt, Samtiden 1 - 2005, Retrieved 2 September 2014
 Alfred Kazin Papers at the New York Public Library

1915 births
1998 deaths
American literary critics
City College of New York alumni
Jewish American writers
People from Brownsville, Brooklyn
Writers from New York (state)
Journalists from New York City
20th-century American non-fiction writers
Columbia Graduate School of Arts and Sciences alumni
20th-century American Jews
Members of the American Academy of Arts and Letters